The Coronation Cup is a greyhound racing competition held annually at Romford Greyhound Stadium.

Race history
It was inaugurated in 1981 at Southend Stadium. However, in 1985 Southend closed and the event switched to Romford.   It is not to be confused with the Coronation Stakes that was held at Wembley.

Past winners

Venues & Distances 
1981-1985 (Southend, 647 metres)
1986–present (Romford, 575 metres)

Sponsors
1994-2010 (Tony Williams)
2011-present (Coral)

References

Greyhound racing competitions in the United Kingdom
Sport in the London Borough of Havering
Recurring sporting events established in 1981